Palli Jhikki  is a village in Shaheed Bhagat Singh Nagar district of Punjab State, India. The village is administrated by Sarpanch an elected representative of the village.

Demography 
As of 2011, Palli Jhikki has a total number of 411 houses and population of 1892 of which 970 include are males while 922 are females according to the report published by Census India in 2011. The literacy rate of Palli Jhikki is 79.76% higher than the state average of 75.84%. The population of children under the age of 6 years is 173 which is 9.14% of total population of Palli Jhikki, and child sex ratio is approximately 765 as compared to Punjab state average of 846.

Most of the people are from Schedule Caste which constitutes 43.45% of total population in Palli Jhikki. The town does not have any Schedule Tribe population so far.

As per the report published by Census India in 2011, 936 people were engaged in work activities out of the total population of Palli Jhikki which includes 583 males and 353 females. According to census survey report 2011, 77.88% workers describe their work as main work and 22.12% workers are involved in Marginal activity providing livelihood for less than 6 months.

Education 
The village has a Punjabi medium, co-ed upper upper primary with secondary/higher secondary school established in 1975. and a primary school established in 1994. The schools provide mid-day meal as per Indian Midday Meal Scheme. As per Right of Children to Free and Compulsory Education Act the school provide free education to children between the ages of 6 and 14.

Amardeep Singh Shergill Memorial college Mukandpur, KC Engineering College and Doaba Khalsa Trust Group Of Institutions are the nearest colleges.

List of schools nearby:
Guru Gobind Singh Public School, Palli Jhikki (Primary with Upper Primary)
Govt Senior Secondary School, Ladhana Jhikka
Dashmesh Model School, Kahma
Govt High School, Jhander Kalan
Govt Gigh School, Khan Khana
Guru Ram Dass Public School, Cheta

Transport 

See also 
List of villages in India

References

External links 
 Tourism of Punjab
 Census of Punjab
 Locality Based PINCode

Villages in Shaheed Bhagat Singh Nagar district